The Women's 500 m Time Trial was one of the 8 women's events at the 2008 European Track Championships, held in Pruszków, Poland.

9 cyclists participated in the contest.

The race was held on September 6.

Final results

 DNS = Did not start.

References

 

2008 European Track Championships
Women's time trial (track cycling)